Matthias Cuntz (born 4 May 1990 in Karlsruhe) is a German footballer who plays for SV Elversberg.

Cuntz made his debut for Karlsruhe on 5 February 2010, in a 2–1 away defeat against St. Pauli, coming off the bench to replace Marco Engelhardt in the 61st minute.

References

External links
 

1990 births
Living people
Footballers from Karlsruhe
German footballers
Association football midfielders
Karlsruher SC players
Karlsruher SC II players
SC Rheindorf Altach players
SV Eintracht Trier 05 players
SV Elversberg players
2. Bundesliga players
Regionalliga players
21st-century German people